Dipodium fragrans is an orchid species that is native to south-east Asia. It was formally described in 2006. It occurs in Sumatra, Peninsular Malaysia, Borneo and Sulawesi.

References

External links 

fragrans
Orchids of Indonesia
Orchids of Malaysia
Plants described in 2006